

Results

References

2018 African Championships in Athletics
Discus throw at the African Championships in Athletics